Mary Norwak (née Stock) (20 January 1929 – 5 October 2010) was a Norfolk-based British food writer who specialized in regional British food. She was educated at Haberdashers' Aske's School for Girls.  She published more than 100 cookbooks. Her best-known work, English Puddings: Sweet and Savoury, published in 1981, remains a standard reference on the subject.

Selected publications

References

See also
 List of British desserts

1929 births
2010 deaths
British food writers